Harmans is an unincorporated community in Anne Arundel County, Maryland, United States. Amtrak's Northeast Corridor high-speed rail line runs through the community; however, Amtrak and MARC trains do not stop as there is no station.

References

Unincorporated communities in Anne Arundel County, Maryland
Unincorporated communities in Maryland